Chandragopal Gajadhar Misra (1876-1957) was an Indian politician. He was a Member of Parliament, representing Madhya Pradesh in the Rajya Sabha the upper house of India's Parliament as a member of the  Kisan Majdoor Praja Party.

References

Rajya Sabha members from Madhya Pradesh
1876 births
1957 deaths